Trachystola scabripennis is a species of beetle in the family Cerambycidae. It was described by Francis Polkinghorne Pascoe in 1862. It is known from Java, Vietnam, Sumatra, and Borneo.

References

Lamiini
Beetles described in 1862